The Courier of Lyon (French: L'affaire du courrier de Lyon) is a 1923 French historical drama film directed by Léon Poirier and starring Roger Karl,  Daniel Mendaille and Émile Saint-Ober.

It is based on the 1796 Courrier de Lyon case, which has been turned into many films including a 1937 French release The Courier of Lyon.

Main cast
 Roger Karl as Joseph Lesurques / Dubosc  
 Daniel Mendaille as Le comte de Maupry  
 Émile Saint-Ober as Durochat  
 Laurence Myrga as Madeleine Brebant  
 Suzanne Bianchetti as Clotilde d'Argence  
 Blanche Montel as Mme Lesurques  
 Marcel Bourdel as Vidal  
 Paul Horace as Courriol  
 Amy Vautrin as Elise Audebert 
 Suzanne Dantès as Claudine Barrière  
 Albert Brouett as Campion  
 Émile Garandet as Guénot  
 Colette Darfeuil
 Georges Deneubourg as L'accusateur public
 André Daven as Audebert

References

Bibliography
 Klossner, Michael. The Europe of 1500-1815 on Film and Television: A Worldwide Filmography of Over 2550 Works, 1895 Through 2000. McFarland & Company, 2002.

External links 
 

1923 films
French silent feature films
1920s French-language films
Films directed by Léon Poirier
Films set in the 1790s
French historical drama films
1920s historical drama films
Gaumont Film Company films
French black-and-white films
1923 drama films
Silent drama films
1920s French films

fr:L'Affaire du courrier de Lyon (film, 1923)